The Blowering Dam is a major ungated rock fill with clay core embankment dam with concrete chute spillway impounding a reservoir under the same name. It is located on the Tumut River upstream of Tumut in the Snowy Mountains region of New South Wales, Australia. Purposes for the dam include flood mitigation, hydro-power, irrigation, water supply and conservation. The dam is part of the Snowy Mountains Scheme, a vast hydroelectricity and irrigation complex constructed in south-east Australia between 1949 and 1974 and now run by Snowy Hydro.

Location and features
The dam was built by consortium including Morrison, Knudsen, Utah and Mcdonald on behalf of the New South Wales Department of Land and Water Conservation for town water supplies, river flows and domestic requirements, irrigated agriculture, industry, flood mitigation and environmental flows. Together with releases from Burrinjuck Dam, on the Murrumbidgee River, Blowering Dam also provides a regulated flow of water for the Coleambally and Murrumbidgee Irrigation Areas.

The uncontrolled concrete chute spillway is capable of discharging .

A 33 million upgrade of facilities was completed between 2009 and 2012, and involved the construction of a parapet wall on top of the dam wall crest and raising the spillway training walls. Storage capacity and water releases from the dam were not altered by the upgrade.

Power generation

The power station has  rated hydraulic head.

Recreation

Gallery

See also 

 List of dams and reservoirs in New South Wales
 Hume and Hovell Track
 Snowy Mountains Scheme
 Snowy Hydro Limited

References

External links
 
 
 
 Blowering Dam at Ken Warby's website
 Storage Report from NSW Water Information
 Hydro Power Stations at Snowy Hydro

Dams completed in 1968
Hydroelectric power stations in New South Wales
Snowy Mountains Scheme
Snowy Mountains Highway
Embankment dams
Dams in the Murray River basin
Rock-filled dams
Dams in New South Wales